Scrobipalpa minimella is a moth in the family Gelechiidae. It was described by Turati in 1929. It is found in Tunisia.

References

Scrobipalpa
Moths described in 1929